The Fire Services Act 1951 was an Act of the United Kingdom Parliament which extended only to Great Britain.

The Act amended parts of the Fire Services Act 1947 which dealt with the Firemen's Pension Scheme; it did not directly concern fire-fighting or the organisation of fire brigades in Great Britain.

The Act was repealed both in Scotland and in England and Wales by s.63 and Schedule 2 of the Fire and Rescue Services Act 2004.

See also

Fire Services Act 1947
Fire Services Act 1959
Fire and Rescue Services Act 2004
Fire (Scotland) Act 2005

United Kingdom Acts of Parliament 1951
Repealed United Kingdom Acts of Parliament